The Billboard Hot 100 is a chart that ranks the best-performing singles of the United States. Published by Billboard magazine, the data are compiled by Nielsen SoundScan based collectively on each single's weekly physical sales, and airplay. In 2003, there were 11 singles that topped the chart.

During the year, ten acts achieved a first U.S. number-one single, either as a lead artist or featured guest. Those acts were B2K, LL Cool J, 50 Cent, Sean Paul, Nate Dogg, Clay Aiken, Murphy Lee, Ludacris, and Shawnna. Beyoncé, despite having hit number one with Destiny's Child, also earns her first number one song as a solo act. P. Diddy, 50 Cent, Sean Paul, and Beyoncé were the only acts to hit number one more than once, each of them reaching number one twice throughout the year.

50 Cent and Knowles both had the longest-running singles of 2003: 50 Cent's first number-one single "In da Club" and Knowles' second number-one single "Baby Boy" both topped the Hot 100 for nine straight weeks, longer than any single to have topped this year. Hip hop duo OutKast's "Hey Ya!" charted at the top spot for nine consecutive weeks, three of which were in 2003. Although "Hey Ya!" continued its pole position until early 2004, Billboard magazine credited it as one of the longest-running number-one singles of 2003. Rapper Eminem's "Lose Yourself" continued its 12-week chart run at the top spot in this year, but is credited as the longest-running number-one single of 2002. Knowles had the most weeks on top with 17, combining the chart run of both "Crazy in Love" and "Baby Boy". She surpassed the record previously set by 50 Cent during this year, the latter of whom gained a total of 13 weeks at number one combining "In the Club", which is the best-performing single of 2003, and "21 Questions".

With the combined chart run of "Get Busy" and "Baby Boy", the latter in which he is featured, dancehall artist Sean Paul became the most successful Jamaican-born artist in terms of chart performance in the Billboard Hot 100. Seven collaboration singles topped the chart in 2003, setting a record for most number-one collaborations in a calendar year since the onset of the rock era in 1955; the first number-one collaboration to have topped the chart was in 1967 with Somethin' Stupid, a song by singer Frank Sinatra and daughter Nancy Sinatra. The record was later tied in 2004, and broken in 2006 with eight number-one collaborations. American Idol contestant Clay Aiken's debut single "This Is the Night" debuted at number one on the Billboard Hot 100, becoming the first single to do so since 1998. "Crazy in Love", which charted for eight straight weeks in July to August, has been credited as 2003's Song of the Summer.

Chart history

Number-one artists

See also
2003 in music
List of Billboard number-one singles
Billboard Year-End Hot 100 singles of 2003

References

Additional sources
Fred Bronson's Billboard Book of Number 1 Hits, 5th Edition
Joel Whitburn's Top Pop Singles 1955-2008, 12 Edition
Joel Whitburn Presents the Billboard Hot 100 Charts: The 2000s
Additional information obtained can be verified within Billboard's online archive services and print editions of the magazine.

United States Hot 100
2003